Mette Gjerskov (born 28 July 1966 in Gundsø) is a Danish politician, who is a member of the Folketing for the Social Democrats political party. She was elected into parliament at the 2005 Danish general election. She is a former minister for Food, Agriculture and Fisheries.

Background
She finished her studies as an agronomist at the Royal Veterinary and Agricultural University in 1993. Before this she studied mathematics, physics and chemistry at an evening school for adults in Ballerup.

Political career
She worked as a civil servant of the minister of Agriculture from 1995 to 2004. She was elected as deputy of Folketing for the 2005 election. After central-left and left won the election on 15 September 2011, she was nominated as the minister of food, agriculture and fisheries in the cabinet of Helle Thorning-Schmidt. Gjerskov lost her ministry to Karen Hækkerup after the cabinet reshuffle of 9 August 2013.

References

External links
 

1966 births
Living people
People from Roskilde Municipality
Social Democrats (Denmark) politicians
Agriculture ministers of Denmark
Food ministers of Denmark
Fisheries ministers of Denmark
21st-century Danish women politicians
Women members of the Folketing
Members of the Folketing 2005–2007
Members of the Folketing 2007–2011
Members of the Folketing 2011–2015
Members of the Folketing 2015–2019
Members of the Folketing 2019–2022
Members of the Folketing 2022–2026